Jenner's stain (methylene blue eosinate) is used in microscopy for staining blood smears. The stain is dark blue and results in very observable clearly stained nuclei.

References

Staining
Romanowsky stains